The 2009–10 Israeli Women's Cup (Gvia HaMedina Nashim) was the 12th season of Israel's women's nationwide football cup competition.

The competition was won, for the 8th consecutive time, by Maccabi Holon who had beaten Maccabi Be'er Sheva 5–0 in the final.

Results

First round

Quarter-finals

Semi-finals

Final

References

External links
2009–10 State Cup Women Israeli Football Association 

Israel Women's Cup seasons
cup
Israel